The 2011 FC Dallas season was the sixteenth season of the team's existence. They tied the franchise record for most points in the regular season & made the playoffs for the second consecutive year. The season was marked by their debut in the CONCACAF Champions League, where they finished third in their group, behind UNAM Pumas and Toronto FC. Also in the Champions League, they became the first American soccer club to defeat a Mexican team on Mexican soil (UNAM) in a meaningful competition.

Overview

March
On March 19, FC Dallas opened the 2011 Major League Soccer Season at Pizza Hut Park against Brimstone Cup rivals, Chicago Fire. After Chicago scored the opening goal of the match Milton Rodriguez found the net to tie the game at 1–1. Dallas were able to hold onto the tie after falling to 10 men after a Brek Shea red card. The following week the San Jose Earthquakes traveled to Dallas and took home a road win with 2 goals from the 2010 Golden Boot Winner Chris Wondolowski to defeat Dallas 0–2.

April
FC Dallas began April with the first road game of 2011 at Columbus. Coach Schellas Hyndman made several changes to the starting lineup including the first starts for Rubén Luna and new acquisition Fabian Castillo. In the 33' for the second time in the first three games Dallas would go down to 10 men after Jackson was given 2 yellow cards within 1 minute. Dallas was able to hold the 0–0 tie until Andres Mendoza was awarded a penalty which was converted in the 54'. Columbus finished off the game in the 90'+1 with a goal from Eddie Gaven.

On April 5 Daniel Hernandez was named the MLS W.O.R.K.S. Humanitarian of the month for April.  Hernandez has done charity work for the Christopher and Dana Reeve Foundation after his brother Nico, who was a promising soccer player for SMU, was paralyzed in a car accident.

The Colorado Rapids traveled to Dallas for an MLS Cup rematch on Friday April 8.  Colorado who were previously unbeaten in the 2011 season would lose 3–0 with a goal from Ugo Ihemelu and a brace from David Ferreira.

Following his two-goal performance against the Colorado Rapids David Ferreira was named the MLS Player of the Week for the 4th week.

April 17 FC Dallas faced the Portland Timbers at the newly completed Jeld-Wen Field for the Timbers second home match in MLS.  FC Dallas was off to a slow start trailing by 3 goals after the 55' including a goal by former FC Dallas striker Kenny Cooper.  After Brek Shea was moved up to the left wing he was able to assist David Ferreira for his 3rd goal of the year in the 83'.  Three minutes the duo was back on the attack as Ferreira was able to assist Shea for his first goal of the year.  FC Dallas would run out of time as the game ended as a 3–2 loss for FC Dallas.

The FC Dallas squad would remain in Portland the following week for training in preparation of FC Dallas' continued tour of the northwest.  They would travel north of the U.S. border to face the Vancouver Whitecaps on Saturday, April 3 at Empire Field.  The Whitecaps would open the scoring in the 25' taking a 1–0 lead.  In the 55' a major blow was dealt to FC Dallas when David Ferreira was forced to be substituted after a challenge from Jonathan Leathers, which after the game was confirmed had fractured Ferreira's ankle.  Just seconds after Ferreira was carried off of the pitch George John would score a goal to even the score from a corner kick with 10 men on the pitch for FC Dallas.  Dallas would complete the comeback with an 83' goal from Eric Avila to secure the victory on the road.

May
The Los Angeles Galaxy would face FC Dallas at Pizza Hut Park on a stormy Sunday night in Frisco to start the month of May.  LA would begin the match in first place with 15 points through 9 games.  With David Ferreira out due to injury, coach Schellas Hyndman gave Eric Avila the start in his place.  The first half would end without a goal as the rain steadily fell.  Shortly after the restart Fabian Castillo scored his first MLS goal with an assist from Andrew Jacobson.  After only a few minutes the Galaxy would tie the game once again at 1–1 with a goal from Landon Donovan.  As a thunderstorm moved over Frisco the game was forced to be delayed due to lightning in the area.  After an hour break in the game the players finally took the pitch and the game was continued.  In the 88' Brek Shea was able to send in a shot from the left side that sailed over Donovan Ricketts and into the goal to give Dallas the 2–1 lead which would be the final score.

Following the match both Fabian Castillo and Brek Shea were nominated for the AT&T Goal of the Week.  The honor would go to Shea picking up his and FC Dallas' first Goal of the Week for 2011.

At RFK Stadium FC Dallas looked to extend their winning streak to 3 games against D.C. United.  Dallas wasn't able to break through and the game ended in a scoreless draw.

With only 3 days off FC Dallas returned home to face Toronto FC in a midweek match. Just before the halftime whistle George John was pulled down in the box on a set piece and a penalty kick was awarded.  Captain Daniel Hernandez decided to step up and take the spot kick. Hernandez sent keeper Stefan Frei in the wrong direction and put Dallas up 1–0.  This was Hernandez' first goal since 2002.  FC Dallas was able to hold the lead and secure the victory continuing their unbeaten streak without MVP Ferreira.

On May 16, 2011 FC Dallas announced they had signed a contract extension with Brek Shea through 2015.

In the second of three consecutive home matches the Philadelphia Union came to Dallas sitting near the top of the Eastern Conference.  Dallas took the lead in the 29th minute as Brek Shea finished a Fabian Castillo cross.  Castillo was on the attack again in the 43rd minute when he was able to head in a floated cross from Jackson Gonçalves.  That would be Castillo's second goal with FC Dallas and also marked the first time in 2011 that 2 goals had been scored again the Union.  Kevin Hartman and the FC Dallas defense were able to finish the game without conceding a goal for the third consecutive game.

Sunday, May 22 Real Salt Lake met with FC Dallas on another rainy night in North Texas.  This was the first match between the two clubs since the 2010 MLS Cup playoffs which Dallas won with a 3–2 aggregate score.  With the game still tied at 0–0 in the 83rd minute referee David Gantar was forced to delay the game as a thunderstorm moved into the area.  The game was continued after an hour-and-fifty-two-minute delay, but unlike the LA Galaxy game FC Dallas were not able to score a gold to get the three points.  The game ended at 0–0 with Kevin Hartman and the FC Dallas defense earning their fourth straight clean sheet.

After only two days off since their last match, FC Dallas was in Seattle to face the Seattle Sounders FC at Qwest Field in front of 36,026 fans.  Dallas was able to strike first after Brek Shea was able to find the net on a pass from Andrew Jacobson in the 18th minute.  That would be the only goal of the match as Seattle was not able to score after holding 65.4% of the possession and 19 attempts on goal.

In the third match within 7 days Dallas was once again on the road as they traveled to Houston for the first leg of the Texas Derby against the Houston Dynamo.  In the 27th minute Andrew Jacobson was able to score the first goal of the match after he headed in a rebound off a Fabian Castillo shot the hit the post.  Shortly before the halftime whistle the Dynamo were able to equalize from a Cam Weaver goal.  Dallas would score a second goal after the halftime break as Ugo Ihemelu headed in a ball off a set piece for the second year in a row in Houston.  Kofi Sarkodie was ejected from the game as he received his second yellow card in the 72nd minute.  Dallas was unable to leave Houston with a win though as Colin Clark was able to score a goal in the 87th minute.  FC Dallas were able to extend their unbeaten streak to 8 games and end the month of May with a club record 15 points.

June

July

August 

On August 3, Dallas played Alianza in the return leg of the CONCACAF Champions League preliminary stage. Holding a 1–0 aggregate lead, Dallas earned another 1–0 win at home to advance to the Group Stage of the Champions League. Ugo Ihemelu scored Dallas' lone goal in the 41st minute. In Group Stage, Dallas was pitted in Group C and will play UNAM Pumas of Mexico, Tauro of Panama and Toronto FC of Canada.

On August 17, Dallas became the first MLS club in history to defeat a Mexican team in Mexico, beating UNAM 1–0 in their Champions League Group Stage opener. Marvin Chávez scored in the 66th minute to give Dallas the game-winning goal.

Squad 
As of September 17, 2011.

Player movement

Transfers

In

Out

Loans

In

Club 

Coaching staff
{|class="wikitable"
|-
!Position
!Staff
|-
|Head coach|| Schellas Hyndman
|-
|Technical director||| Barry Gorman
|-
|Assistant coach|| John Ellinger
|-
|Assistant coach|| Marco Ferruzzi
|-
|Assistant coach|| Drew Keeshan
|-
|Director of Player Development|| Óscar Pareja
|- Management

Preseason

Walt Disney Pro Soccer Classic

Major League Soccer

Standings

Overall standings

Conference standings

Results summary

Match results

Major League Soccer

MLS Cup Playoffs

CONCACAF Champions League 

By being a finalist in the 2010 MLS Cup final, Dallas secured a Preliminary Round-spot in the CONCACAF Champions League.  It will be Dallas' debut in the Champions League as well as any CONCACAF club competition. On May 18, 2011 at the CONCACAF draw in New York City, it was revealed that Dallas would play Salvadorian finalists Alianza.

Preliminary stage

Group stage

U.S. Open Cup 

FC Dallas secured a third round entry into the U.S. Open Cup by finishing in the top 6 during the 2010 MLS regular season.  On June 16, 2011 it was announced that FC Dallas will face the winner of the second round match between Orlando City S.C. and Charleston Battery on June 21, 2011.  Orlando City S.C. defeated the Charleston Battery 1–0 to earn a place in the third round.

Statistics 

All statistics are for competitive matches only.

Appearances and goals

Goalkeeper stats

{| border="1" cellpadding="4" cellspacing="0" style="margin: 1em 1em 1em 1em 0; background: #f9f9f9; border: 1px #aaa solid; border-collapse: collapse; font-size: 95%; text-align: center;"
|-
| rowspan="2"  style="width:1%; text-align:center;"|No.
| rowspan="2"  style="width:1%; text-align:center;"|Nat.
| rowspan="2"  style="width:30%; text-align:center;"|Player
| colspan="3" style="text-align:center;"|Total
| colspan="3" style="text-align:center;"|MLS
| colspan="3" style="text-align:center;"|Champions League
| colspan="3" style="text-align:center;"|Open Cup
|-
|MIN
|GA
|GAA
|MIN
|GA
|GAA
|MIN
|GA
|GAA
|MIN
|GA
|GAA
|-
| style="text-align: right;" |12
|
| style="text-align: left;" |Kevin Hartman
|2160
|23
|0.96
|1980
|21
|0.95
|90
|0
|0.00
|180
|2
|1.00
|-
|
|
| TOTALS
|2160
|23
|0.96
|1980
|21
|0.95
|0
|0
|0
|180
|2
|1.00
|-

Top scorers

{| class="wikitable" style="font-size: 95%; text-align: center;"
|-
!width=60|Rank
!width=60|Nation
!width=60|Number
!width=150|Name
!width=80|Total
!width=80|MLS
!width=80|Champions League
!width=80|Open Cup
|-
|1
|
|20
|Brek Shea
|9
|9
|0
|0
|-
|2
|
|6
|Jackson
|6
|3
|1
|2
|-
|3
|
|18
|Marvin Chávez
|3
|3
|0
|0
|-
|3
|
|10
|David Ferreira
|3
|3
|0
|0
|-
|5
|
|3
|Ugo Ihemelu
|2
|2
|0
|0
|-
|5
|
|15
|Fabian Castillo
|2
|2
|0
|0
|-
|5
|
|14
|George John
|2
|2
|0
|0
|-
|5
|
|9
|Milton Rodriguez
|2
|1
|0
|1
|-
|9
|
|12
|Eric Avila
|1
|1
|0
|0
|-
|9
|
|2
|Daniel Hernandez
|1
|1
|0
|0
|-
|9
|
|4
|Andrew Jacobson
|1
|1
|0
|0
|-
|9
|
|19
|Zach Loyd
|1
|1
|0
|0
|-
|9
|
|11
|Ricardo Villar
|1
|0
|0
|1
|-
|9
|
|5
|Jair Benitez
|1
|0
|0
|1
|-

Top assists

{| class="wikitable" style="font-size: 95%; text-align: center;"
|-
!width=60|Rank
!width=60|Nation
!width=60|Number
!width=150|Name
!width=80|Total
!width=80|MLS
!width=80|Champions League
!width=80|Open Cup
|-
|1
|
|4
|Andrew Jacobson
|5
|5
|0
|0
|-
|2
|
|18
|Marvin Chávez
|4
|4
|0
|0
|-
|rowspan="3"| 3
|
|15
|Fabian Castillo
|3
|3
|0
|0
|-
|
|2
|Daniel Hernandez
|3
|3
|0
|0
|-
|
|11
|Ricardo Villar
|3
|1
|1
|1
|-
|rowspan="3"| 5
|
|6
|Jackson
|2
|2
|0
|0
|-
|
|19
|Zach Loyd
|2
|2
|0
|0
|-
|
|5
|Jair Benitez
|2
|2
|0
|0
|-
|rowspan="7"| 9
|
|12
|Eric Avila
|1
|1
|0
|0
|-
|
|20
|Brek Shea
|1
|1
|0
|0
|-
|
|10
|David Ferreira
|1
|1
|0
|0
|-
|
|7
|Milton Rodriguez
|1
|1
|0
|0
|-
|
|8
|Bruno Guarda
|1
|1
|0
|0
|-
|
|14
|George John
|1
|1
|0
|0
|-
|
|24
|Eric Alexander
|1
|0
|0
|1
|-

Disciplinary record

{| class="wikitable" style="font-size: 95%; text-align: center;"
|-
| rowspan="2"  style="width:5%; text-align:center;"|Position
| rowspan="2"  style="width:5%; text-align:center;"|Nation
| rowspan="2"  style="width:5%; text-align:center;"|Number
| rowspan="2"  style="width:15%; text-align:center;"|Name
| colspan="2" style="text-align:center;"|Total
| colspan="2" style="text-align:center;"|MLS
| colspan="2" style="text-align:center;"|Champions League
| colspan="2" style="text-align:center;"|Open Cup
|-
!  style="width:60px; background:#fe9;"| 
!  style="width:60px; background:#ff8888;"|
!  style="width:60px; background:#fe9;"|
!  style="width:60px; background:#ff8888;"|
!  style="width:60px; background:#fe9;"|
!  style="width:60px; background:#ff8888;"|
!  style="width:60px; background:#fe9;"|
!  style="width:60px; background:#ff8888;"|
|-
| MF
|
| 6
| Jackson
|5
|1
|5
|1
|0
|0
|0
|0
|-
| MF
|
| 20
| Brek Shea
|4
|1
|4
|1
|0
|0
|0
|0
|-
| DF
|
| 19
| Zach Loyd
|4
|0
|3
|0
|0
|0
|1
|0
|-
| MF
|
| 4
| Andrew Jacobson
|4
|0
|4
|0
|0
|0
|0
|0
|-
| MF
|
| 2
| Daniel Hernández
|3
|0
|3
|0
|0
|0
|0
|0
|-
| DF
|
| 14
| George John
|3
|0
|3
|0
|0
|0
|0
|0
|-
| DF
|
| 3
| Ugo Ihemelu
|3
|0
|3
|0
|0
|0
|0
|0
|-
| MF
|
| 18
| Marvin Chávez
|2
|0
|2
|0
|0
|0
|0
|0
|-
| FW
|
| 34
| Rubén Luna
|1
|0
|1
|0
|0
|0
|0
|0
|-
| FW
|
| 7
| Milton Rodriguez
|1
|0
|1
|0
|0
|0
|0
|0
|-
| DF
|
| 16
| Bobby Warshaw
|1
|0
|1
|0
|0
|0
|0
|0
|-
| MF
|
| 8
| Bruno Guarda
|1
|0
|1
|0
|0
|0
|0
|0
|-
| DF
|
| 5
| Jair Benitez
|1
|0
|0
|0
|0
|0
|1
|0
|-
| MF
|
| 23
| Andrew Wiedeman
|1
|0
|0
|0
|0
|0
|1
|0
|-
|
|
|
| TOTALS
|34
|2
|31
|2
|0
|0
|3
|0
|-

Recognition

MLS W.O.R.K.S. Humanitarian of the Month

MLS Player of the Week

AT&T Goal of the Week

MLS All-Stars 2011

Miscellany

Allocation ranking 
FC Dallas is in the No. 11 position in the MLS Allocation Ranking. The allocation ranking is the mechanism used to determine which MLS club has first priority to acquire a U.S. National Team player who signs with MLS after playing abroad, or a former MLS player who returns to the league after having gone to a club abroad for a transfer fee. A ranking can be traded, provided that part of the compensation received in return is another club's ranking.

International roster spots 
FC Dallas has 9 international roster spots. Each club in Major League Soccer is allocated 8 international roster spots, which can be traded. The club acquired an additional spot from Toronto FC on August 2, 2011 for use during the remainder of the 2011 season only. There is no limit on the number of international slots on each club's roster. The remaining roster slots must belong to domestic players. For clubs based in the United States, a domestic player is either a U.S. citizen, a permanent resident (green card holder) or the holder of other special status (e.g., refugee or asylum status).

Future draft pick trades 
Future picks acquired: 2012 SuperDraft conditional pick acquired from Colorado Rapids.
Future picks traded: 2012 SuperDraft Round 2 pick traded to Sporting Kansas City; 2012 SuperDraft Round 4 pick traded to Seattle Sounders FC; 2012 Supplemental Draft Round 1 pick traded to Chivas USA; 2013 SuperDraft Round 2 pick traded to Philadelphia Union.

Notes

External links
FC Dallas

2011
American soccer clubs 2011 season
2011 Major League Soccer season
2011 in sports in Texas